Xydias is a surname. Notable people with the surname include:

Alex Xydias (born 1922), American racecar driver
Anthony J. Xydias (1882–1952), American film producer